is a train station in Ōmachi, Kishima District, Saga Prefecture, Japan. It is operated by JR Kyushu and is on the Sasebo Line.

Lines
Only Sasebo Line local services stop at this station.

Station layout 
The station, which is unstaffed, consists of an island platform serving two tracks with a siding branching off track 1. The station building is a small brick structure. The ticket window which it houses has become unstaffed and the building presently serves only as a waiting room. Access to the island platform is by means of a footbridge.

Adjacent stations

History
Japanese Government Railways (JGR) opened the station on 11 December 1919 as Ōmachi Signal Box on the existing track of what was then the Nagasaki Main Line. On 1 September 1928, the facility was upgraded to a full station and passenger services commenced. On 1 December 1934, station became part of the Sasebo Line. With the privatization of Japanese National Railways (JNR), the successor of JGR, on 1 April 1987, control of the station passed to JR Kyushu.

Passenger statistics
In fiscal 2015, there were a total of 91,291 boarding passengers, giving a daily average of 250 passengers.

Environs
Saga Sanyo Industries
Ōmachi City Hall
Ōmachi Post Office
Ōmachi Higashi Post Office
Ōmachi Hospital
Ōmachi Police Station
Ōmachi Elementary School
Ōmachi Junior High School

See also
 List of railway stations in Japan

References

External links
Ōmachi Station (JR Kyushu)

Railway stations in Saga Prefecture
Sasebo Line
Railway stations in Japan opened in 1896